Charleston is the nation's 95th largest designated market area (DMA), with 326,770 households and 0.27% of the U.S. TV population. The following stations are licensed in Charleston and have significant operations or viewers in the city:

Major network television affiliates 
 WCBD-TV (2, NBC, CW+): owned by Nexstar Media Group, studios in Mount Pleasant, licensed in Charleston
 WGWG (4, Heroes & Icons): (owned by Howard Stirk Holdings), studios in Mount Pleasant, licensed in Charleston
 WCSC-TV (5, CBS): owned by Gray Television, studios in Charleston,  licensed in Charleston
 WITV-TV (7, PBS): owned by South Carolina Educational Television, transmitter in Mount Pleasant, South Carolina, licensed in Charleston
 WHDC-LD (12, Court TV): owned by Lowcountry 34 Media, LLC, licensed in Charleston
 WLCN-CD (18, CTN): owned by Christian Television Network, studios in Summerville, licensed in Charleston
 WTAT-TV (24, Fox): owned by Cunningham Broadcasting, studios in North Charleston, licensed in Charleston
 WAZS-LD (29, Azteca America Independent): owned by Jabar Communications, studios in North Charleston, licensed in Charleston
 WCIV (36, My Network Television, ABC): owned by Sinclair Broadcast Group, studios in Mount Pleasant, licensed in Charleston

Radio

FM
WSCI - South Carolina Educational TV Radio [89.3 MHz] - NPR News and Classical
WKCL - We Know Christ Lives [91.5 MHz] - Contemporary Christian
WCKN - 92.5 Kickin' Country [92.5 MHz] - Country music
WWWZ - Z93 Jamz [93.3 MHz] - Urban Contemporary
WSCC - NewsRadio94.3 [94.3 MHz] - News / Talk
W234CV - The Zone 94.7 MHz Sports
WSSX - 95SX [95.1 MHz] - Contemporary Top 40
W238CO - La Raza 103.9 95.5 MHz - Regional Mexican
WMXZ - Modern Hits 95.9  [95.9 MHz] - Modern Hits
WOHM - [96.3 MHz] Variety
WIWF - The Wolf [96.9 MHz] - Classic Hits
WYBB - 98 Rock [98.1 MHz] - Active Rock
W253BW - 98.5 WQSC [98.5 MHz] Classic Country
WTMZ-FM -ESPN [98.9 MHz] - Sports
W257BQ - The Box [99.3 MHz] - Urban Contemporary (Simulcast on 95.9 WMXZ HD2)
WXST - Star99.7 [99.7 MHz] - Urban Adult Contemporary
W261DG - Heaven 100.1 [100.1 MHz] - Gospel (Heaven 1390AM FM Translator) 
WALC - HIS Radio [100.5 MHz] - Contemporary Christian
WAYA-FM - WAY-FM [100.9 & 101.3 MHz] - Contemporary Christian
WAVF - CHUCK FM [101.7 MHz] - Adult Hits
W254BK - The City [102.1 MHz] - Greatest Hits of the 60s, 70s, & 80s (Simulcast on WQNT 1450 AM)
WXLY - Y102.5 [102.5 MHz] - Adult Contemporary
WEZL - WEZL 103.5 [103.5 MHz] - Country
W280EX - La Raza 103.9 [103.9 MHz] Regional Mexican
WRFQ - Q104.5 [104.5 MHz] - Classic Rock
WCOO - 105.5 The Bridge [105.5 MHz] - Album Adult Alternative
WJNI - Gospel 106.3 [106.3 MHz] - Gospel
WMGL - 107-3 MAGIC [107.3 MHz] - Urban Adult Contemporary

AM
WLTQ - [730 kHz] - Religious
WTMZ - The Zone [910 kHz] - Sports Talk
WCDC - Moody Radio Charleston [950 kHz] - Christian radio
WAZS - La Raza 103.9 [980 kHz] - Regional Mexican
WTMA - The Lowcountry's Big Talker [1250 kHz] - News / Talk
WQSC - Classic Country 98.5 FM [1340 kHz] - Classic Country
WSPO - Heaven 1390 [1390 kHz] - Gospel (Simulcast on 95.9 HD3)
WQNT - [1450 kHz] - The City (Greatest Hits of the 60s, 70s, & 80s)
WZJY - La Raza 103.9 [1480 kHz] - Regional Mexican (Simulcast of 980 AM)

High definition digital radio
1640   XSUR - 70s & 80s ("Surfside 1640")

 Print, online media and mobile apps 

 Local newspapers in Charleston include The Post and Courier, the Charleston City Paper, The Charleston Chronicle, the Charleston Regional Business Journal, The Catholic Miscellany, and the Island Eye News.
 A local online-only paper is TheDigitel.
 A popular, local digital publication is Charleston Daily. Charleston Daily can also be found across multiple mobile apps celebrating in everything Charleston, South Carolina''.

See also
 South Carolina media
 List of newspapers in South Carolina
 List of radio stations in South Carolina
 List of television stations in South Carolina
 Media of locales in South Carolina: Columbia, Greenville

References

External links
Charleston radio stations on TvRadioWorld
Local Charleston online travel gGuide

Charleston